The United Labor Party was a short-lived alliance of 115 different labor unions and labor parties including the Central Labor Union, Knights of Labor, and the Socialist Labor Party. It was formed as a response of the rising "red scare" following the Haymarket Affair. After the formation of the party, the party leaders reached out to Henry George, who was sympathetic enough to labor to run under a labor banner but also educated enough to be a viable candidate, who eventually agreed to run for the United Labor Party after seeing 36,000 signatures in support of him. The party ran for the New York City mayoral position in 1886 with the candidate Henry George, who ended in second, ahead of Republican Candidate Theodore Roosevelt and behind the Democratic Candidate Abram Hewitt. The Party also had an unsuccessful attempt to run in the 1887 Philadelphia mayoral election with the candidate Tomas Phillips. After the two elections, there was heavy conflict between the Georgist faction of the party and the Socialist faction of the party, eventually ending in a Georgist-Socialist split in 1887, which effectively ended the alliance.

References

Trade unions
United States labor law
Labor parties in the United States
Knights of Labor
Socialist Labor Party of America
Political parties disestablished in 1887
1887 disestablishments in New York (state)
Regional and state political parties in New York (state)
State and local socialist parties in the United States